Gretta Nahomi Martínez Flores (born 5 April 1997), known as Nahomi Martínez, is a Peruvian footballer who plays as a midfielder for Club Universitario de Deportes and the Peru women's national team.

International career
Martínez represented Peru at the 2013 South American U-17 Women's Championship and two South American U-20 Women's Championship editions (2014 and 2015). At senior level, she played two Copa América Femenina editions (2014 and 2018) and the 2019 Pan American Games.

International goals
Scores and results list Peru's goal tally first

References

External links

1997 births
Living people
Women's association football midfielders
Peruvian women's footballers
Footballers from Lima
Peru women's international footballers
Pan American Games competitors for Peru
Footballers at the 2019 Pan American Games
Sporting Cristal footballers